Mancipium Mariae (Latin the slavery/a slave of Mary) – a Christian devotion.

Its rules, referring to older traditions, were formulated from the inspiration of Jesuit Kasper Drużbicki in following works:
Franciscus Phoenicius (Franciszek Stanisław Fenicki), Mariae mancipium, Lublin 1632
Jan Chomentowski (Chomętowski), Pętko Panny Maryjej albo sposób oddawania się Błogosławionej Pannie Marii za sługę i niewolnika, Lublin 1632

In ancient Rome, mancipium meant the relation of subjection of one person to another, existing because of mancipatio (the reverse process is the emancipation), as well as a person subjected thus.

The devotion consisted on the act of yielding oneself prisoner to the Mother of God – of subjection to her will. Each slave of Mary had also the duty of praying a litany in the morning and evening and an office on Saturday. The sign of the slavery was a fetters-shaped chainlet with the inscription ego mancipium Mariae.

This sort of piety gained a great popularity in the age of Baroque (perhaps, among others, Wespazjan Kochowski used to practise it) and had a significant impact on the development of Marian veneration in the Church.

See also
Kasper Drużbicki
Louis de Montfort
Immaculate Heart of Mary
Sacred Heart
Miraculous Medal
Stefan Wyszyński
Totus Tuus

Bibliography
Encyklopedia wiedzy o jezuitach na ziemiach Polski i Litwy. 1564-1995, Ludwik Grzebień (ed.), Kraków 1996.
Karol Górski, Zarys dziejów duchowości w Polsce, Kraków 1986.
Maria Eustachiewicz, "Wstęp", Wespazjan Kochowski, Utwory poetyckie. Wybór, Wrocław-Warszawa-Kraków 1991, p. III-LXXX.

References

Society of Jesus
Baroque
Marian devotions
Catholic devotions
Prayer
Devotional medals
Polish literature
Late Latin literature
Catholic theology and doctrine
Christian symbols
Ethics